The Story of Piera is a 1983 Italian drama film directed by Marco Ferreri. Hanna Schygulla won the award for Best Actress at the 1983 Cannes Film Festival.

Plot
The film starts in one of the new towns of Latina with the birth of Piera, daughter of the somewhat unbalanced Eugenia and her apparently sane husband Lorenzo, who has a job with the PCI. Eugenia's behaviour at home and in public becomes increasingly erratic and when on top of this Lorenzo loses his post, the strain puts him into a mental hospital. Piera leaves school to work for a dressmaker and pursues her dream of acting, eventually breaking into television and theatre. Interleaved with her outside life we see her sexual development, from kissing neighbourhood boys to a lesbian relationship while she is in hospital with breathing problems and finally to adult men. While Piera is maturing as a woman and as an actress, Eugenia is deteriorating and has to be locked away. The film ends with Piera taking her mother out for the day to a deserted beach, where the two women undress and hug each other tightly in a moment of natural tenderness.

Cast
 Isabelle Huppert as Piera
 Hanna Schygulla as Eugenia
 Marcello Mastroianni as Lorenzo
 Angelo Infanti as Tito and as actor playing Jason
 Tanya Lopert as Elide
 Bettina Grühn as the young Piera
 Renato Cecchetto
 Maurizio Donadoni as Massimo
 Aiché Nanà as the midwife
 Girolamo Marzano
 Lidia Montanari as "Cento mille lires"
 Laura Trotter as young midwife
 Marina Zanchi
 Lina Bernardi
 Elisabetta Ambrosini
 Fiametta Baraila
 Serana Bennato
 Rita Caldana
 Cristina Forti
 Loredana Bertè (herself, singer "Sei bellissima")

References

External links

1983 films
1983 drama films
Films directed by Marco Ferreri
1980s Italian-language films
Italian LGBT-related films
Lesbian-related films
Films about sexuality
Films scored by Philippe Sarde
Films based on biographies
1983 LGBT-related films
1980s Italian films